The Warehouse Cooperative School (1969-1975) was an American free school / alternative school which flourished in and near Boston, Massachusetts in the late 1960s and early 1970s.

This was a time of experimentation and change in America, in education as well as other fields.  Founded by Dr. Knowles Dougherty and his wife, Darlene Dougherty, as a K-12 school because they found no existing school satisfactory for their children, the Warehouse School was in the tradition of A.S. Neill's Summerhill School and other free schools in allowing an extreme amount of personal choice to students.  Older students could choose which classes to attend, or indeed whether to attend classes at all; and within that context the student was entirely responsible for whether he or she considered his or her own learning satisfactory, as no grades were given. Nor were students segregated into grades; the only classifications were primary, intermediate, and secondary. Primary students had more guidance and restrictions than middle and secondary students.

Furthermore, much learning at the Warehouse School did not occur in classrooms, but in assorted ad hoc groupings of students and faculty in a variety of formal and informal settings of short or long duration.

Borrowing from The Real Great Society (a very creative educational institution in Manhattan, an outgrowth of a research project carried out in conjunction with Charles W. Slack's work toward his Ph.D. at Harvard), there was a big bulletin board where a schedule for all the classes/groups was posted. Classes ranged from French to Math to Woodworking.

The Warehouse School was named for its open-plan physical plant. After its early years, it moved into a former factory, which contained some classrooms but was mostly a large hangar-like open space. This allowed students, faculty, and community members to construct or deconstruct spaces at will to serve current needs and desires.

As part of its cooperative model, parents or guardians of students were required to donate time to the school. This allowed the school to draw upon the skills of community members for teaching or other activities, involved parents closely in their child's education, and fostered group cohesion.

A general comparison may be made to the Sudbury Valley School, founded in the same area at almost the same time. The two schools differed in many significant particulars, though.

Never financially secure, the Warehouse School became victim to the changing times. The school folded in 1975.

Graduates of the Warehouse School include Susan Butcher, noted as a female Iditarod Trail Sled Dog Race champion. Former faculty include naturalist and author Don Stokes and botanist Peter Del Tredici.

Related publications
Hurwitz, Al, editor. The Warehouse Cooperative School, Programs for Promise(Harcourt & Brace, 1972)
Allen, Ed, editor. The Warehouse Cooperative School, The Responsive House, (Boston, MIT Press, 1974)
Dougherty, Knowles, author. "An Analysis of the Effectivenuess of an Alternative School in Meeting the Needs of Several Types of Students Whose Needs Were Not Met in Traditional Schools", (Ph.D. Dissertation, Harvard University, 1973)

External links 
Warehouse School alumni page

Defunct schools in Massachusetts
Educational institutions established in 1969
Educational institutions disestablished in 1975
1969 establishments in Massachusetts